Professor Phineas Potter is a fictional character appearing in American comic books published by DC Comics and appears in the comics that feature Superman and several related characters, most notably Jimmy Olsen.

Publication history
Phineas Potter first appeared in Superman's Pal, Jimmy Olsen #22 (August 1957) and was created by Otto Binder and Curt Swan.

Fictional character biography

Pre-Crisis
The original incarnation of Professor Potter was the maternal uncle of Lana Lang and first encountered the Man of Steel during his teenage years as Superboy. A professor and eccentric scientist, Potter often invented odd or fantastical devices which he intended to use for the betterment of humanity. However, he rarely considered the potential downsides of his inventions. While several of his devices were harmless, many others were not and chaos often ensued when they were activated.

Potter befriended three newspaper reporters from the Daily Planet: Lois Lane, Jimmy Olsen and Clark Kent. Olsen, in particular, was often the intended victim of Potter's inventions gone awry. Thanks to Potter and his inventions, Olsen was briefly evolved into a super-intelligent being from one million A.D., given an elongated nose like the character Pinocchio, stricken with "flame-breath", and cursed with an evil twin, among other calamities. However, Potter was able to recreate a serum which had once given Olsen stretchability powers. Thus, Olsen was able to occasionally use those powers as Elastic Lad.

Post-Crisis
Following the Crisis on Infinite Earths limited series, Superman's history was revised, such that Clark Kent did not begin his public superhero career until adulthood, and thus never operated as Superboy. In the revised continuity, Phineas Potter's role in the Superman mythos has been largely replaced by a seemingly more competent professor named Emil Hamilton. Potter eventually appears as a scientist working at the Hawaiian branch of S.T.A.R. Labs. The Superboy he encounters is Conner Kent, the hybrid clone of Superman and Lex Luthor. There is no apparent relationship to Lana Lang.

In other media
A similar themed character appeared on the Adventures of Superman television series in the 1950s. The absent-minded Professor Pepperwinkle is portrayed by Phil Tead in five episodes of the series, which featured George Reeves as Superman. Pepperwinkle also appeared in Superman comics during the 1970s.

Professor Potter appears in The Adventures of Superboy. 

In Smallville, Lana Lang has a maternal aunt named Nell Potter  (played by Sarah-Jane Redmond).

References

External links
 Professor Potter at DC Wiki
 Supermanica: Professor Potter Supermanica entry on the Pre-Crisis Professor Potter.
 Supermanica: Professor Pepperwinkle Supermanica entry on the Pre-Crisis Professor Pepperwinkle.

Characters created by Curt Swan
Characters created by Otto Binder
Comics characters introduced in 1957
DC Comics male characters
DC Comics scientists
Fictional chemists
Fictional inventors
Fictional professors
Superman characters